Casse-tête chinois pour le judoka (Italian title: Ore violente, German title: Die sieben Masken des Judoka) is a 1967 French-Italian-German adventure and spy film directed by Maurice Labro.

Synopsis 
Marc St. Clair wins a medal at a kendo tournament in Tokyo, which he gives to his American friend Clyde for good luck. As an airplane pilot, Clyde accompanies a C.I.A. agent, Finn, on a secret mission to fly over China to investigate a supersonic bomber. In Clyde's absence, Marc begins an affair with Jennifer, his girlfriend, before learning of the plane's disappearance. Remorseful, Marc leaves for Hong Kong to find Clyde where he confronts the powerful Black Dragons.

Cast 

 Marc Briand (Marc St-Clair)
 Marilù Tolo (Jennifer)
 Heinz Drache (Finn)
 Maria Minh (Sutchuen)
 Paolo Tiller (Clyde)
 François Maistre (Dragon)
 Adaly Bayle (Alize)
 André the Giant (fighter)

References

External links 
 

1960s French-language films